Marseille bar massacre refers to the mass murder of ten people in the Bar du Téléphone in Marseille, France, on 3 October 1978. Three armed gunmen entered the bar and shot everyone present in the head, with the sole survivor being the owner's wife Nicole Léoni, who was in another room. The massacre was largely taken up by the French press at the time.

Police believed the attack to have been part of a gang war between rival organised crime gangsters led by Tony Zampa and opposing Jack le Mat. The killings were compared to the Saint Valentine's Day Massacre in the United States. Pierre Michel, the investigative judge in charge of the case, was himself shot dead on 21 October 1981. François Cecchi and François Girard, both gangsters of the 'French Sicilian Connection', were imprisoned for life for Michel's assassination.

The case was still ongoing when Michel was killed and so far remains unsolved, as nobody has ever been convicted for the massacre.

See also
 Monbar Hotel attack
 Sofitel massacre

References

1978 murders in France
1978 mass shootings in Europe
Bar massacre
20th-century mass murder in France
Attacks on bars in Europe
Attacks on buildings and structures in Marseille
Deaths by firearm in France
Mass murder in 1978
Massacres in 1978
Mass shootings in France
Massacres in France
Bar massacre
October 1978 crimes
October 1978 events in Europe
Organized crime events in France
Unsolved mass murders
Unsolved murders in France
Violent non-state actor incidents in Europe